Plymouth Argyle Football Club is an English association football club based in Plymouth, Devon. Founded in 1886 as Argyle Football Club, they became a professional club in January 1903, and were elected to the Southern League ahead of the 1903–04 season. The club won the Southern League championship in 1913 and finished as runners-up on two occasions, before being elected to the Football League in 1920, where they compete to this day, as a founder member of the Third Division. Argyle won their first Football League championship, and promotion to the Second Division for the first time, ten years later in 1930. As of May 2011, the club has won five championships in the Football League, gained promotion on eight occasions, and been relegated nine times. Four of those league championships were won in the third tier, which is a divisional record. Argyle have made one appearance at Wembley Stadium, in which they won the 1996 Third Division play-off final. The club has also achieved moderate success in domestic cup competitions; they reached the semi-finals of the FA Cup in 1984, and the quarter-finals in 2007. Argyle have also reached the semi-finals of the League Cup twice, in 1965 and 1974.

In that time, the club has had 37 permanent managers. They are listed below in chronological order. Including caretakers, 49 individuals have held responsibility for team selection. The club's first manager was Frank Brettell, who was appointed in March 1903. He led the club to the Western League title, their first in the professional game, in 1905 before retiring. The most successful person to manage the club is Bob Jack, who was also Argyle's first professional player. He won the Southern League in 1913 and the Third Division South in 1930, having finished as runner-up on six occasions. He then established the club in the second tier of English football and guided them to their joint highest league finish of 4th in the Second Division. He is also the club's longest serving manager. Having spent one year as player-manager during the 1905–06 season, Jack returned in 1910 as manager and club secretary. He retired in 1938 after 29 years of service.

Four people have managed the club in two separate terms, of whom the most recent was Paul Sturrock. The first was Bob Jack in 1910 and it wasn't equalled until 1970 when Ellis Stuttard returned for a second two-year spell. Malcolm Allison was the third in 1978, having previously joined the club in 1964, and Sturrock made it four in November 2007, returning to Home Park three years after departing to manage in the Premier League. 12 of the club's managers have also played for Argyle competitively, not including Ian Holloway who came out of retirement in October 2006 to play for the club's reserve team. Outside forward Bob Jack was the first in 1905 and he has been succeeded by full back Jimmy Rae and centre forward Jack Rowley, both of whom also won league titles with the club, among others. 13 other people have been in charge as a caretaker, including former players Steve McCall and Kevin Summerfield (twice). Five managers have won major league championships with the club, of whom both Jack and Sturrock were successful twice. Three others have achieved promotion to a higher division.

Managers

Footnotes
A. : Managers are listed in chronological order. Caretakers are not included.
B. : Statistics are sourced to Danes (2009), Complete Record, up to and including the 2008–09 season, and to Soccerbase thereafter.
C. : Bretell won the Western League title in 1905.
D. : Managers who also played for the club competitively.
E. : The club chose to operate with a committee between 1907 and 1910.
F. : Managers who returned for a second term.
G. : Jack won the Southern League in 1913, and Third Division South in 1930.
H. : Matches played in the abandoned 1939–40 season and subsequent wartime competitions, including the 1945–46 Football League season, are generally not included by football statisticians.
I. : Rae won the Third Division South title in the 1951–52 season.
J. : Rowley won the Third Division title in the 1958–59 season.
K. : Waiters won promotion from the Third Division in the 1974–75 season.
L. : Smith won promotion from the Third Division in the 1985–86 season.
M. : Warnock won promotion from the Third Division via the play-offs in the 1995–96 season.
N. : Sturrock won the Third Division in 2002, and the Second Division in 2004.
O. : Williamson achieved the unlikely feat of winning a league title in his first game as manager. He succeeded Paul Sturrock, who was in charge for 34 league games that season.
P. : Win / Draw / Loss Updated following the game on 11 August 2018

References
General

Specific

External links
Plymouth Argyle F.C. official website
Plymouth Argyle F.C. archive

 
Managers
Plymouth Argyle F.C.